Brian McAllister Linn is an American military historian, who specializes in the 20th century. He serves on the faculty at Texas A&M University. He was born in the territory of Hawaii and graduated from Ohio State University.

Education
Ph.D., The Ohio State University, 1985
M.A., The Ohio State University, 1981
B.A. with High Honors, University of Hawai’i, 1978

Career 
Linn has been the recipient of a John Simon Guggenheim Fellowship, a Woodrow Wilson Fellowship, and an Olin Fellowship.  He taught as a visiting professor at the Army War College and a Fulbright Fellow at the National University of Singapore and the University of Birmingham.  He is a past president of the Society for Military History.

Works 
Linn, Brian McAllister. Elvis's Army: Cold War GIs and the Atomic Battlefield. Cambridge, Massachusetts: Harvard University Press, 2016.  
Linn, Brian McAllister. The Echo of Battle: The Army's Way of War. Cambridge, MA: Harvard University Press, 2009.
Linn, Brian McAllister. The United States: Anticipating and Conducting War, 1939-1942. Washington, DC: Heritage Foundation, 2006.
Linn, Brian McAllister. The Impact of the Imperial Wars (1899-1907) on the U.S. Army. Washington, DC: Heritage Foundation, 2005. 
Linn, Brian McAllister. Eisenhower, the Army, and the American Way of War. Manhattan, Kansas: Dept. of History, Kansas State University, 2003.
Linn, Brian McAllister. The Philippine War, 1899-1902. Lawrence: University Press of Kansas, 2000.
Linn, Brian McAllister. Guardians of Empire: The U.S. Army and the Pacific; 1902-1940. Chapel Hill: Univ. of North Carolina Press, 1998. 
Linn, Brian McAllister. The U.S. Army and Counterinsurgency in the Philippine War, 1899-1902. Chapel Hill: University of North Carolina Press, 1989.

References

External links

Living people
Year of birth missing (living people)
American military historians
Texas A&M University faculty
Ohio State University alumni
University of Hawaiʻi at Mānoa alumni
Historians from Texas